Amandine may refer to:
 Edibles:
 Amandine (cake), a Romanian chocolate sponge cake filled with chocolate or almond cream
 Amandine (garnish), a French culinary term for a garnish of almonds
 Amandine potato, a type of potato
 Amandine (band), a Swedish musical band
 Amandine (given name)

See also 
 Almandine, a type of garnet
 
 Amandin (disambiguation)